John Marshall Law School may refer to:

UIC John Marshall Law School in Chicago, Illinois, now known as University of Illinois Chicago School of Law
Atlanta's John Marshall Law School in Atlanta, Georgia
Cleveland-Marshall College of Law in Cleveland, Ohio, now known as the CSU College of Law
John Marshall Law School in Newark, New Jersey, now known as Seton Hall University School of Law